Amotherby  railway station served the village of Amotherby in the Northern English county of North Yorkshire. It was located on a local line which ran from Malton to a junction with the Gilling and Pickering line in Gilling.

History

Opened by the York, Newcastle and Berwick Railway, then absorbed by the North Eastern Railway the station joined the London and North Eastern Railway during the Grouping of 1923. This company closed the station to passengers in 1930, although the goods service then passed on to the Eastern Region of British Railways upon nationalisation in 1948. Special and excursion passenger trains used the station until 27 July 1964, the last ramblers excursion to Kirbymoorside running on 3 May 1964, and the last passenger train was a Sunday school excursion. Most of the line closed to freight on 10 August 1964, but Amotherby station remained open until 17 October 1964 to honour a long-term contract with a local mill. Thus the 3½ mile long section between Amotherby and Malton was the last part of the Thirsk and Malton line to close.

References

Further reading
 
 (Misspells station name as Amotherley)
 Station on navigable O.S. map.

Disused railway stations in North Yorkshire
Former North Eastern Railway (UK) stations
Railway stations in Great Britain opened in 1853
Railway stations in Great Britain closed in 1931